Satya Raj Acharya and Swaroop Raj Acharya are Nepali singers, songwriters, and composers. They are also biological brothers. Satya is the elder and Swaroop is the younger. They often perform together, for which reason they are credited together by their first names. They are the sons of renowned singer, Bhakta Raj Acharya.

Satya Raj Acharya is also an actor; he acted in the 2011 film Acharya, which was a biopic based on his father's life.

Personal life 
Sons of one of Nepal's most renowned singers, Bhakta Raj Acharya, are Satya and Swaroop. They were raised in a musically inclined environment because their father is a well-known figure in the nation. They have performed numerous songs both individually and collectively. Even though they have numerous individual songs, they frequently perform in concert together and are referred to as a team, so they are given credit as a component.

Partial discography

References

External links 

 
 

Living people
Khas people
Dohori singers
Nepali-language singers
Nepalese playback singers
Nepalese ghazal singers
Year of birth missing (living people)
Sibling musical duos